Early general elections were held in Montserrat on 20 September 1973. The result was a victory for the Progressive Democratic Party (PDP), which won five of the seven seats in the Legislative Council. PDP leader Percival Austin Bramble remained Chief Minister.

Background
Following the 1970 elections, the next elections were not due until March 1976. However, Bramble asked the Governor to dissolve the Legislative Council on 7 August, resulting in early elections. Bramble claimed that he required a new mandate to combat racism in the island's education system.

Results

References

Elections in Montserrat
Montserrat
General election
Montserratian general election